The following radio stations broadcast on AM frequency 1030 kHz: 1030 AM is a United States clear-channel frequency. WBZ Boston is the dominant Class A station on 1030 AM.

In Argentina 
 LS10 Del Plata in Argentina

In Guatemala (Channel 50)
TGUX in Guatemala City

In Mexico 
  in Ciudad del Carmen, Campeche
 XEIE-AM in Matehuala, San Luis Potosí
 XENKA-AM in Felipe Carrillo Puerto, Quintana Roo
  in Mexico City
 XEROPJ-AM in Lagos de Moreno, Jalisco.
  in Puerto Nuevo, Baja California
 XEVFS-AM in Las Margaritas, Chiapas

In the United States 
Stations in bold are clear-channel stations.

References

Lists of radio stations by frequency